The following is a list of all active aircraft squadrons of the Pakistan Air Force (PAF), sorted by type. Squadrons are listed by their current names and roles.

Aerial Refueling Squadrons

Aerobatics Display Squadrons

Airborne Early Warning Squadrons

Combat Squadrons

Combat Commanders' School Squadrons

Electronic Warfare Squadrons

Search and Rescue Squadrons

Training Squadrons

Transport Squadrons

See also

 Pakistan Air Force
 Pakistan Naval Air Arm

References

Footnotes

External links 
 Pakistan Air Force Squadrons
 Pakistan Air Force Order of Battle
 Pakistan Air Force Museum

Squadrons
Lists of flying squadrons
 
Air Force squadrons
Air forces-related lists